Togg, acronym of Türkiye'nin Otomobili Girişim Grubu (Türkiye's Automobile Joint Venture Group), is a Turkish automotive manufacturer of electric luxury cars headquartered in Gebze, Kocaeli province, Türkiye. The assembly plant of Togg that was opened in October is located in Gemlik, Bursa province, next to his subsidiary Siro which produce the lithium-ion batteries. The company was founded as a joint venture by 5 Turkish companies in 2018. Sales of the first vehicule, the Togg T10X, started in March 2023.

History 

The companies and organizations that decided to work together to produce domestic cars in Turkey were announced by President Recep Tayyip Erdoğan in November 2017. For this purpose, Turkey's Car was launched on June 25, 2018 by Anadolu Group (19%), BMC (19%), Kök Group (19%), Turkcell (19%), Zorlu Holding (19%) and TOBB (5%). Turkey's Automobile Joint Venture Group Inc. was established. In September 2019, it was claimed that Kök Group would withdraw from the project. In October 2019, the company headquarters moved from Şişli, Istanbul to Gebze, Kocaeli. The CEO of the company, Gürcan Karakaş, announced that the car, whose design will be completed in 2019, will go on sale in 2022. The SUV and sedan models of Togg Domestic Car were introduced at a press conference held on December 27, 2019. TOGG's body design work was done together with the Italian design company Pininfarina.

In 2021, Anadolu Group, Turkcell, and Vestel (part of Zorlu Holding) invested more money to increase the total capital from ₺150 million to almost ₺1 billion, and their share to about 23% each, while those of BMC (Turkey) and TOBB increased to 23% and 8% respectively.

Togg established a factory in Gemlik, Bursa for the production of electric cars with a cost of ₺22 billion. It was announced that project-based state aid would be given for the factory. Construction of the factory started on May 21, 2020. In August 2020, it was decided that the company would manufacture under the Togg brand. On December 18, 2021, Togg's new logo was introduced. Togg's international debut took place at the CES 2022 event in Las Vegas, Nevada, USA, on January 5, 2022.

Models

The two models of the Togg Turkish national car unveiled in December 2019 are both all-electric vehicles with  range options. Both cars will have an eight-year battery warranty.

Production plan

Haralar in the Gemlik district of Bursa Province was chosen as the production plant site. The site was preferred for its proximity to a seaport, a free-trade zone and to suppliers. The construction cost of the production plant is budgeted at  22 billion (approx. US$1.2 billion). Employment of 4,323 people is planned at the production plant. Annual production of 175,000 electric vehicles  is planned, but that may not be enough to avoid the risk to the economy of Turkey of increasing oil imports until 2040. For the first stage, it is planned that 100 cars will be produced for the first time within the Togg production plan.

Suppliers
Commercial scale lithium production as a side product of boron is planned for 2022.  Togg has also entered into a JV with the Chinese battery company Farasis to manufacture lithium batteries for the car: the new 50/50 venture is called Siro, and will be built near Ankara.

Economics 
In June 2022 less than 1% of cars sold were electric.  the special consumption tax(Turkish) – a sales tax on luxuries, at the start of Togg sales in March 2023 has been proposed to be:

 Up to 160 kW motor and price before tax under ₺700,000 - 10%
 Up to 160 kW motor and price before tax over   ₺700,000 - 45%
 Over 160 kW motor and price before tax under ₺750,000 - 50%
 Over 160 kW motor and price before tax over   ₺750,000 - 60%
There is also 18% value added tax.

Lawsuit 
In June 2021, Togg filed a complaint in order to obtain the domain name “togg.com”, which was previously purchased by someone else, and brought the issue to the World Intellectual Property Organization (WIPO). Togg, in their complaint, stated that the company was founded in 2018 to produce cars and the plaintiff does not have a factory yet but it unveiled plans for two electric vehicles in December 2019. In response the defense said that the domain was bought in 2003 by computer engineer named George Gould for the company named "The Office of George Gould" before selling his company and naming rights to another company in 2010 and the domain is already redirected to the website of another company (tcbinc.com) which is the current owner of the disputed "togg.com" and provides computer infrastructure services.

In September 2021, the complaint of Togg was rejected and ruled in favor of the domain registrant and found that the complaint was brought in bad faith (Reverse Domain Name Hijacking – RDNH). In the judgment, it was also stated that Togg was right in its complaint about name similarity, but it was concluded that the defendant bought the domain name in 2014, 4 years before Togg was founded, and therefore it was not possible to have bad intentions.

References

External links 
 

Turkish companies established in 2018
Vehicle manufacturing companies established in 2018
Car manufacturers of Turkey
Car brands
Electric vehicle manufacturers of Turkey
Gebze